Desert Winds is an album by saxophonist Illinois Jacquet with guitarist Kenny Burrell recorded in 1964 and released on the Argo label.

Reception

Allmusic awarded the album 3½ stars stating "An underappreciated and unassuming album, Desert Winds has plenty of easy charm, and while there are no barn-burning solos here, there are plenty of moments of quiet and lyrical joy".

Track listing 
All compositions by Illinois Jacquet except as noted
 "When My Dreamboat Comes Home" (Cliff Friend, Dave Franklin) - 5:20   
 "Desert Winds" (Esmond Edwards) - 4:15   
 "Star Eyes" (Gene de Paul, Don Raye) - 4:15   
 "Blues for the Early Bird" - 3:10   
 "Lester Leaps In" (Lester Young) - 7:15   
 "You're My Thrill" (Jay Gorney, Sidney Clare) - 3:45   
 "Canadian Sunset" (Eddie Heywood, Norman Gimbel) - 6:10

Personnel 
Illinois Jacquet - tenor saxophone, alto saxophone
Kenny Burrell - guitar
Tommy Flanagan - piano
Wendell Marshall - bass
Ray Lucas - drums
Willie Rodriguez - latin drums

References 

1964 albums
Argo Records albums
Illinois Jacquet albums
Albums produced by Esmond Edwards
Albums recorded at Van Gelder Studio